Thibau Nys (born 12 November 2002) is a Belgian cyclo-cross and road cyclist, who currently rides for UCI WorldTeam  on the road and for UCI Cyclo-cross team  in cyclo-cross. Nys is the son of Sven Nys, one of the most successful cyclo-cross riders of all time.

Nys has followed in his father's footsteps and has started cyclo-cross from an early age on. He has already obtained three Belgian and one European cyclo-cross title in the youth categories. On 2 February 2020, he won the men's junior title at the 2020 UCI Cyclo-cross World Championships. On 11 September 2021, he added the men's U23 European Road Race Championships in Trento.

Major results

Cyclo-cross

2018–2019
 3rd Overall UCI Junior World Cup
1st Pontchâteau
2nd Tábor
 Junior DVV Trophy
1st Hamme
1st Baal
1st Lille
 Junior Superprestige
1st Hoogstraten
2nd Middelkerke
3rd Gieten
3rd Zonhoven
 1st Junior Neerpelt
 1st Junior Leuven
 3rd  UEC European Junior Championships
 3rd National Junior Championships
 Junior Brico Cross
3rd Ronse
2019–2020
 1st  UCI World Junior Championships
 1st  UEC European Junior Championships
 1st  National Junior Championships
 1st  Overall UCI Junior World Cup
1st Bern
1st Tábor
1st Koksijde
1st Namur
1st Heusden-Zolder
1st Nommay
3rd Hoogerheide
 1st Overall Junior Superprestige
1st Gieten
1st Gavere
1st Zonhoven
1st Diegem
1st Middelkerke
3rd Ruddervoorde
 Junior DVV Trophy
1st Kortrijk
1st Baal
1st Lille
 Junior Ethias Cross
1st Hulst
2nd Eeklo
 Junior Rectavit Series
1st Neerpelt
 1st Junior Waterloo
 1st Junior Iowa City
2021–2022
 Under-23 X²O Badkamers Trophy
1st Loenhout
1st Baal
1st Herentals
3rd Koppenberg
3rd Lille
 3rd  UCI World Under-23 Championships
 3rd  UEC European Under-23 Championships
 3rd Oostmalle
2022–2023
 1st  UCI World Under-23 Championships
 1st  Overall UCI Under-23 World Cup
1st Tábor
1st Maasmechelen
1st Zonhoven
1st Benidorm
 2nd  UEC European Under-23 Championships
 3rd National Championships

Road

2021
 1st  Road race, UEC European Under-23 Championships
 2nd Road race, National Under-23 Championships
 6th Road race, UCI World Under-23 Championships
2022
 1st  Overall Flèche du Sud
1st  Young rider classification
1st Stage 3

References

External links

2002 births
Living people
Belgian male cyclists
Cyclo-cross cyclists
Belgian cyclo-cross champions
People from Bonheiden
Cyclists from Antwerp Province